The Northland Arboretum is a 583-acre non-profit arboretum and nature reserve in Brainerd, Minnesota, United States.

The arboretum was founded in 1972 when the Brainerd Landfill closed; that original  landfill site now supports a grassland. The Arboretum now contains a Red Pine plantation and an area of Jack Pine savanna, with nearly 20 kilometers of trails for hiking and cross-country skiing, of which nearly 5 kilometers are lit for evening skiing. Other areas include a native tree trail, youth gardens, a wildflower trail, and a pond with arched bridge. The Nature Conservancy owns nearly  within the arboretum. 

Arboretum plants include woodland wildflowers such as shinleaf, rattlesnake-plantain, blue-bead lily, and pink lady's slipper; prairie vegetation such as silky prairie clover, birdfoot violet, blue-eyed grass, gayfeather, and pasque flower; and grasses such as big bluestem, kalm's brome, muly-grass, porcupine grass, and June grass.

See also 
 List of botanical gardens in the United States

External links
Official website

Arboreta in Minnesota
Nature reserves in Minnesota
Protected areas of Crow Wing County, Minnesota
Brainerd, Minnesota